Salama language can be:
Salumã language (Arawakan)
Salumá language (Cariban)